Imre Hennyei (14 July 1913 – 6 September 1989) was a Hungarian épée fencer. He competed at the 1948 and 1952 Summer Olympics.

References

External links
 

1913 births
1989 deaths
Hungarian male épée fencers
Olympic fencers of Hungary
Fencers at the 1948 Summer Olympics
Fencers at the 1952 Summer Olympics
People from Kotor
20th-century Hungarian people